Lakuntza is a town and municipality located in the autonomous community of Navarra, in northern Spain.

References

External links
 LAKUNTZA in the Bernardo Estornés Lasa - Auñamendi Encyclopedia (Euskomedia Fundazioa) 

Municipalities in Navarre